María Celia "Celi" Tejerina Mackern (born 15 June 1994) is an Argentine sailor. She placed 21st in the women's RS:X event at the 2016 Summer Olympics. She competed at the 2020 Summer Olympics.

She competed at the 2019 Pan American Games, winning a silver medal.

Notes

References

External links
 
 
 
 

1994 births
Living people
Argentine windsurfers
Female windsurfers
Argentine female sailors (sport)
Olympic sailors of Argentina
Sailors at the 2016 Summer Olympics – RS:X
Sailors at the 2020 Summer Olympics – RS:X
Pan American Games silver medalists for Argentina
Pan American Games medalists in sailing
Sailors at the 2015 Pan American Games
Sailors at the 2019 Pan American Games
Medalists at the 2019 Pan American Games
Sportspeople from Mendoza, Argentina